The Videos 86>98 is a music video compilation by Depeche Mode, featuring almost two dozen music videos directed by a variety of directors, released in 1998. It coincides with The Singles 86>98.

The original movie was released on VHS and DVD. There was however a special edition, DVD only, called Videos 86>98 + (without "The", and with "+") released in 2002. The DVD was two discs, the first disc being identical to the only disc in the original DVD, while the second DVD contains bonus material not found in the original release.

Videos

VHS: Mute Films / MF033 (UK) 

 Intro [short documentary on the making of some of the videos] (Sven Harding)
 Stripped – (Black Celebration, February 1986)
Directed by Peter Care
 A Question of Lust – (Black Celebration, April 1986)
Directed by Martyn Atkins
 A Question of Time – (Black Celebration, August 1986)
Directed by Anton Corbijn
 Strangelove [unedited] – (Music for the Masses, April 1987)
Directed by Anton Corbijn
 Never Let Me Down Again [short version] (Music for the Masses, August 1987)
Directed by Anton Corbijn
 Behind the Wheel [short version] – (Music for the Masses, December 1987)
Directed by Anton Corbijn
 Little 15 – (Music for the Masses, May 1988)
Directed by Martyn Atkins
 Everything Counts (Live) – (101, February 1989)
Directed by D.A. Pennebaker
 Personal Jesus [unedited] – (Violator, August 1989)
Directed by Anton Corbijn
 Enjoy the Silence – (Violator, February 1990)
Directed by Anton Corbijn
 Policy of Truth – (Violator, May 1990)
Directed by Anton Corbijn
 World in My Eyes [MTV version] – (Violator, September 1990)
Directed by Anton Corbijn
 I Feel You – (Songs of Faith and Devotion, February 1993)
Directed by Anton Corbijn
 Walking in My Shoes [unedited] – (Songs of Faith and Devotion, April 1993)
Directed by Anton Corbijn
 Condemnation (live version from Devotional) – (Songs of Faith and Devotion, September 1993)
Directed by Anton Corbijn
 In Your Room – (Songs of Faith and Devotion, January 1994)
Directed by Anton Corbijn
 Barrel of a Gun [original] – (Ultra, February 1997)
Directed by Anton Corbijn
 It's No Good – (Ultra, March 1997)
Directed by Anton Corbijn
 Home – (Ultra, June 1997)
Directed by Steven Green
 Useless – (Ultra, October 1997)
Directed by Anton Corbijn
 Only When I Lose Myself (The Singles 86-98, September 1998)
Directed by Brian Griffin, cinematography by Eric Alan Edwards
 Depeche Mode – A Short Film [long documentary of the band's history] (Sven Harding)

DVD: Mute / DVDMuteL5 (UK – 2000) 

 Same as VHS release

DVD: Mute / DMDVD2 (UK – 2002)

Disc One

 Same as above

Disc Two

The Videos
But Not Tonight [from the film Modern Girls] 
 Directed by Tamra Davis
Strangelove '88 [US version] 
 Directed by Martyn Atkins
One Caress 
 Directed by Kevin Kerslake
Condemnation [Paris Mix] 
 Directed by Anton Corbijn
3 Short Films
Violator – Electronic Press Kit (11 November 1990)
Songs of Faith and Devotion – Electronic Press Kit (27 January 1993)
Ultra – Electronic Press Kit (26 February 1997)
Easter egg
 Track 10 of this disc features the "Rush" easter egg. This is a short (one-minute) montage of the various graphics the design firm Intro created for The Singles releases, set to a re-edited version of the song with the same name.

Personnel
David Gahan
Martin Gore
Andrew Fletcher
Alan Wilder (member of the band from 1982 to 1995, and does not appear in any of the videos made after 1995, except "Intro" and "Depeche Mode – A Short Film")
Nassim Khalifa – black haired woman in the "Strangelove" video
Lysette Anthony – woman in the "I Feel You" video
Ippolita Santarelli – woman in the "Behind the Wheel" video
Hildia Campbell – backup singer in the "Condemnation" live video
Samantha Smith – backup singer in the "Condemnation" live video
Daniel Miller – seen in interviews
Anton Corbijn – seen in interviews

References

External links 
 

Depeche Mode video albums
1998 video albums
Music video compilation albums
1998 compilation albums